The genus Ixodia  is a small genus of songbirds in the bulbul family, Pycnonotidae.

It has three species:

 Spectacled bulbul (Ixodia erythropthalmos)
 Grey-bellied bulbul (Ixodia cyaniventris)
 Scaly-breasted bulbul (Ixodia squamata)

References

Ixodia (bird)
Bird genera
Birds of Malaysia
Taxa named by Edward Blyth